Lambert Darchis (baptised 31 July 1625; died 25 February 1699) was an arts patron from Liège. He is also thought to have been an ecclesiastic, but according to some sources his ordination has never been confirmed.

Life 
Son of Jacques Darchis and Marguerite Froidmont, he was baptised in the church of Notre-Dame aux Fonts in Liège. From 1646 to his death he worked in Rome for the Roman Curia. His will was proven on 22 October 1696 and funded the creation of the 'fondation Lambert-Darchis', which granted travel bursaries to young artists, art restorers, art historians, engravers, composers and would-be ecclesiologists who had been born or were living in Liège or the surrounding diocese. The foundation still exists.

Recipients of the Fondation

18th century 
 Jean-Noël Hamal (1709–1778), composer
 Laurent-Benoît Dewez (1731–1812), architect
 Léonard Defrance (1735–1805), painter
 Joseph Dreppe (1737–1810), engraver
 André Modeste Grétry (1741–1813), composer
 Henri Hamal (1744–1820), composer

19th century 
 Gilles-François Closson (1796–1842), painter
 Louis-Eugène Simonis (1810–1882), sculptor
 Jean-Mathieu Nisen (1819–1885), painter
 Victor Fassin (1826–1906), painter
 Adolphe Fassin (1828–1900), sculptor
 Jules Halkin (1830–1888), sculptor
 Léon Philippet (1843–1906), painter
 Alphonse de Tombay (1843–1918), sculptor
 Léon Mignon (1847–1898), sculptor
 Adrien de Witte (1850–1935), painter and engraver
 Joseph Pollard (1853–1922), sculptor

20th century 
 François Maréchal (1861–1945), engraver
 Richard Heintz (1871–1929), painter
 Dieudonné Jacobs (1887–1967), painter
 Jean-Pierre Ransonnet (born 1944), painter
 Pierre Petry (1945–2017), sculptor
 Claude Rahir (1937–2007), painter, sculptor, mosaicist

References

Bibliography (in French)
A. Micha, « La fondation Darchis », Bulletin de l'institut archéologique liégeois, Liège, t. XL, 1910, p. 99-115 (ISSN 0776-1260)
Jean Puraye, La Fondation Lambert-Darchis à Rome, Liège, Fondation Lambert Darchis, 1993, 424 p.
Jean Puraye, « Pierre-Joseph Antoine, boursier Darchis. », Bulletin de la société royale Le Vieux-Liège, t. XII, no 262, 1993, p. 441-451 (ISSN 0776-1309)

Clergy from Liège
1625 births
1699 deaths
17th-century philanthropists
Belgian patrons of the arts
Belgian patrons of music